Aquaphobia is an irrational fear of water.

Aquaphobia is considered a specific phobia of natural environment type in the Diagnostic and Statistical Manual of Mental Disorders. A specific phobia is an intense fear of something that poses little or no actual danger.

Etymology
The correct Greek-derived term for "water-fear" is hydrophobia, from ὕδωρ (hudōr), "water" and φόβος (phobos), "fear". However, this word has long been used in English to refer specifically to a symptom of later-stage rabies, which manifests itself in humans as difficulty in swallowing, fear when presented with liquids to drink, and an inability to quench one's thirst. Fear or aversion to water in general is referred to as aquaphobia.

Prevalence
A study of epidemiological data from 22 low, lower-middle, upper-middle and high-income countries revealed "fear of still water or weather events" had a prevalence of 2.3%, across all countries; in the US the prevalence was 4.3%. In an article on anxiety disorders, Lindal and Stefansson suggest that aquaphobia may affect as many as 1.8% of the general Icelandic population, or almost one in fifty people. In America, 46% of American adults are afraid of deep water in pools and 64% are afraid of deep open waters.

Manifestation for aquaphobia
Specific phobias are a type of anxiety disorder in which a person may feel extremely anxious or have a panic attack when exposed to the object of fear. Specific phobias are a common mental disorder.

Psychologists indicate that aquaphobia manifests itself in people through a combination of experiential and genetic factors. Five common causes of aquaphobia: instinctive fear of drowning, experienced an incident of personal horror, has an overprotective parent/parent with aquaphobia, psychological difficulty adjusting to water and lack of trust in water. 

In the case of a 37 year old media professor, he noted that his fear initially presented itself as a "severe pain, accompanied by a tightness of his forehead," and a choking sensation, discrete panic attacks and a reduction in his intake of fluids.

Signs and symptoms 
Physical responses include nausea, dizziness, numbness, shortness of breath, increased heart rate, sweating and shivering.

In addition the signs and symptoms above, some general signs and symptoms one may display in reaction to a specific phobia may include:
 Physical Symptoms: trembling, hot flushes or chills, pain or tightness in chest, butterflies in stomach, feeling faint, dry mouth, ringing in ears, confusion
 Psychological Symptoms: feeling fear of losing control, fainting, dread and dying.

Treatment and case studies 
A few treatment options include:
 Hypnosis and systematic desensitization - 28 year old female, aquaphobia from childhood, hypnosis and systematic desensitization in an 8-week 5-session program, 2-month and 1-year follow up. 37 year old male, 10 years of extreme aquaphobia (could not even drink water), 6 sessions of hypnotherapy, therapy was successful, no relapse and 6 month follow up. 
 Cognitive Behavioral Therapy 
 Exposure therapy 
 Medication

See also

 List of phobias
 Thalassophobia – fear of the sea

References

Phobias
Water